The National Congress for the Defence of the People (CNDP) is a political armed militia established by Laurent Nkunda in the Kivu region of the Democratic Republic of the Congo in December 2006. The CNDP was engaged in the Kivu conflict, an armed conflict against the military of the Democratic Republic of the Congo. In January 2009, the CNDP split and Nkunda was arrested by the Rwanda government. The remaining CNDP splinter faction, led by Bosco Ntaganda, was planned to be integrated into the national army.

History 

General Laurent Nkunda had been a senior officer in the rebel Congolese Rally for Democracy (Goma faction) after 1998.  Following the end of the Second Congo War in 2003, he was offered a position in the army of the transitional government but refused to join out of fear that he would be arrested due to the International Criminal Court investigation against him.  In 2004 his troops attacked Bukavu before retreating, but he rebelled again in November 2006 and attacked Goma. After sustaining heavy casualties in battle with the Pakistani battalion of the United Nations Mission in the Democratic Republic of Congo (MONUC), he entered negotiations with the government and agreed to put his men into mixage, which involved mixing rebel and non-rebel units together but is not brassage. Perhaps inspired by the recently concluded general elections, when Nkunda engaged in negotiations with Major General John Numbi, at that time head of the Congolese air force, he declared the group he led to be the National Congress for the Defence of the People on 30 December 2006.  Nkunda benefited greatly from mixage; before 2007, he had two brigades while mixage created five mixed brigades.  While numbers are disputed, Nkunda's two original brigades (the 81st and the 83rd) numbered about 2,200 men but by May 2007 some 8,000 to 8,500 men considered themselves under his command.  This expansion was at least partially accomplished because Nkunda began incorporating all manner of men with unclear backgrounds into the brigades under his control, including former Rwandan soldiers, members of former militias who had been demobilized and had no skills outside of war, and others simply attracted to his populist Tutsi rhetoric.

Prior to mixage, Nkunda's troops controlled a swathe of Masisi Territory from Goma north through Sake, Kirolirwe and Kitchanga (Nkunda's homeland) and then further north and west.  With his new mixage battalions, Nkunda was able to control large areas of Masisi and Rutshuru and expand north and east toward the border with Uganda.  Newly formed national brigades were ordered to establish territorial control, which Nkunda took to mean fighting the Hutu Democratic Forces for the Liberation of Rwanda (FDLR) descended from the groups that carried out the Rwandan genocide.  In late March 2007, Numbi left Goma in what the International Crisis Group sees as an attempt to distance himself from a disaster in the making, as accusations mounted that the CNDP was in effect setting up a small kingdom in Masisi.  In late April, the military stopped the creation of the sixth brigade scheduled to be under Nkunda.  The mixed brigades carried out offensives against the FDLR from mid-April to mid-May but, despite the claims of the CNDP, did poorly as they had little logistical support and the FDLR fought well. The military demanded that the CNDP soldiers undergo brassage, mixage having failed, and three months of standoff ensued as relations between soldiers loyal to Nkunda and loyalist troops grew increasingly tense. Matters reached a breaking point when the army chief of staff declared that the offensive against the FDLR would be halted.  After an international outcry, he reversed himself but stated that only units that had undergone brassage would be allowed to fight, apparently in the belief that the all-Tutsi CNDP units were more likely to be indiscriminately violent towards the mostly Hutu population of the FDLR heartland. On 28 August 2007, soldiers loyal to Nkunda ambushed pro-Kinshasa soldiers of the Bravo brigade in Rubare.  Within days the CNDP-government violence had vastly escalated and the government was carrying out full-scale offensives against the CNDP by 6 September.

Kiwandja massacre 
The CNDP under the command of Col. Sultani Makenga was accused of massacring 67 civilians in 2008 in the town of Kiwandja in North Kivu. The head of the UN Human Rights Commission, Navi Pillay, accused Makenga of committing war crimes.

Splintering of the CNDP 
In early January 2009, Bosco Ntaganda, a commander in the CNDP and former chief of military operations of the Union of Congolese Patriots, declared that he was taking leadership from Nkunda.  On January 16, he appeared at a joint press conference with Congolese Minister of the Interior and Security Célestin Mbuyu Kabangu, the Inspector General of the Police General John Numbi, Rwanda's Chief of Defence Staff General James Kabarebe, and other senior Congolese military officers, where he declared that he was joining forces with the national army to fight the FDLR.  Nkunda was arrested on 22 January after he had crossed in Rwanda.  After unsuccessfully attempting to defeat the CNDP militarily, Congolese president Kabila made a deal with President Kagame of Rwanda to allow Rwandan soldiers into the DRC to uproot FDLR militants in exchange for Rwanda removing Nkunda.  The Congolese government subsequently gave Ntaganda a senior position in the integration of CNDP forces back into the military. Later he effectively acted as deputy commander of Operation Kimia II, the 2009 anti-FDLR operation. About 6,000 CNDP combatants were integrated into the FARDC through what became known as the 'accelerated integration' process. The UN Children's Fund has stated that the CNDP has verbally committed to release all child soldiers in its ranks.

On March 23, 2009, the CNDP signed a peace treaty with the government, in which it agreed to become a political party in exchange for the release of its imprisoned members.

The armed confrontation resumed three years later, in the 2012 East D.R. Congo conflict.

Footnotes

References 
, International Crisis Group, Africa Report N°133, 31 October 2007

Miller, Eric (2010) THE INABILITY OF PEACEKEEPING TO ADDRESS THE SECURITY DILEMMA: A case study of the Rwandan-Congolese Security Dilemma and the United Nation's Mission in the Congo . Lambert Academic Publishing 
 UN Panel of Experts report, December 2008, S/2008/773

External links 
 CNDP official site (English) 

History of the Democratic Republic of the Congo
Rwandan genocide
History of Rwanda
Rebel groups in the Democratic Republic of the Congo
2006 establishments in the Democratic Republic of the Congo